Heishuihe is a township of Yuanshi County in southwestern Hebei province, China, located in the foothills of the Taihang Mountains about  west-northwest of the county seat. , it has 12 villages under its administration.

See also
List of township-level divisions of Hebei

References

Township-level divisions of Hebei